Peter Miles (29 August 1928 – February 2018) was an English actor. He played many television roles including several different characters in Z-Cars and Doctor Who. His other television work also included Blake's 7, Survivors, The Sweeney, Dixon of Dock Green, Moonbase 3, Poldark and Bergerac. His film credits include roles in Made (1972), The Whistle Blower (1986) and Little Dorrit (1988).

Peter Miles was also an accomplished jazz and soul singer. He was a childhood friend of the singer Dusty Springfield, and the first recording Springfield ever made was with Miles on guitar.

Television work
In the science fiction series Blake's 7 he played the character of Secretary Rontane in the episodes "Seek-Locate-Destroy" and "Trial".

In Doctor Who, he appeared in three serials, as Dr. Lawrence in Doctor Who and the Silurians (1970), Professor Whitaker in Invasion of the Dinosaurs (1974) and Nyder in Genesis of the Daleks (1975).

He played Sheikh Hamad in The Sandbaggers in 1978.

Film work
Appeared in the Henry VIII feature film Monarch alongside Doctor Who actors T. P. McKenna and Jean Marsh.

Radio and other work
He also performed in the BBC Radio 5 Doctor Who audio drama The Paradise of Death in 1993, playing the villain Tragan. Miles contributed to several other Doctor Who spinoffs, including the independent video production More Than a Messiah and the audio dramas Zygons: Absolution and Prosperity Island, all produced by BBV. For the licensed audio drama producers Big Finish Productions, he appeared in Whispers of Terror in 1999 and Sarah Jane Smith: Mirror, Signal, Manoeuvre in 2002. He has reprised his role as Nyder three times; in the 1993 and 2005 productions of the stage play The Trial of Davros, and in the 2006 Big Finish audio drama I, Davros: Guilt. For Magic Bullet Productions, he appeared in five of the Kaldor City SF audio dramas, in the role of scheming politician Landerchild. He has also appeared in the second volume of The True History of Faction Paradox, The Ship of a Billion Years, as the Egyptian deity Anhur.  He played Lord Straxus in the Bernice Summerfield Season 9 episode "The Adventure of the Diogenes Damsel". He also appeared in Lovejoy in the episode "Pig in a Poke".

Death 
On 27 February 2018 Miles' death the previous week at the age of 89 was announced via Twitter.

Filmography

References

External links

1928 births
2018 deaths
English male television actors
English male film actors
English male radio actors